Fibroblast growth factor 20 is a protein which in humans is encoded by the FGF20 gene.

Function
The protein encoded by this gene is a member of the fibroblast growth factor (FGF) family. FGF family members possess broad mitogenic and cell survival activities, and are involved in a variety of biological processes, including embryonic development, cell growth, morphogenesis, tissue repair, tumor growth and invasion. This gene was shown to be expressed in normal brain, particularly the cerebellum. The rat homolog is preferentially expressed in the brain and able to enhance the survival of midbrain dopaminergic neurons in vitro.

References